Ejeta's yellow bat or Ejeta's house bat (Scotophilus ejetai) is a species of vesper bat endemic to in Ethiopia. It was described as a new species of bat in 2014.

Taxonomy and etymology
It was described as a new species in 2014. The eponym for the species name "ejetai" is Ethiopian-American scientist Gebisa Ejeta. Ejeta was honored with the species name because the holotype was collected from Ethiopia, and "the results of [Ejeta's] work have dramatically enhanced the food supply of hundreds of millions of people in sub-Saharan Africa."

Description
The fur on its dorsal surface is a reddish mahogany color, while the fur on its ventral surface is orange with a grayish tint towards its posterior.

Conservation
It is currently assessed as least concern by the IUCN.

References

Endemic fauna of Ethiopia
Bats of Africa
Mammals described in 2014
Scotophilus